Tommy Knudsen (born 9 November 1961 in Roager, Denmark) is a former Motorcycle speedway rider who won eight Speedway World Team Cups, and two World Pairs.

Career
Knudsen first became known when he won the Danish Under-16 Championship in 1975 and 1976 before becoming the Danish Under-21 Champion in 1978.

He became Speedway World Pairs Champion in 1985 with individual World Champion Erik Gundersen and again in 1991 with Hans Nielsen and Jan O. Pedersen. Tommy was also European (World) Under-21 Champion in 1980.

In his first World Final appearance, Knudsen finished a career best 3rd in 1981 at Wembley Stadium in London after losing a ride-off for 2nd to countryman Ole Olsen. Knudsen had earlier defeated Olsen to win the opening heat of the World Final.

After winning the European U/21 title in 1980 and finishing 3rd in the World Final in 1981, a number of fans and members of the speedway press believed that Knudsen would become Denmark's next World Champion. Unfortunately for Knudsen, Denmark's next champion was Erik Gundersen who won the title in 1984 and 1985. Hans Nielsen would go on to win 4 World Championships while Jan O. Pedersen would win in 1991. Although he rode in a further five World Finals (1985, 1986, 1991, 1992 and 1994), Knudsen would never again finish on the podium in a World Final, his best placing being 4th in 1992.

Knudsen was also a member of the Danish team that won the Speedway World Team Cup in 1981, 1985, 1986, 1987, 1988, 1991, 1995 and 1997. At the 1985 Final held in Los Angeles, Knudsen was undefeated on the night, famously holding out US team captain Bobby Schwartz in the penultimate heat to ensure Denmark could not be beaten.

He rode in the UK for the Coventry Bees from 1979 to 1988 and then from 1990 to 1992. 

Knudsen also raced in Australia during the 1980s, winning the "Mr Melbourne" title at the Melbourne Showgrounds in January 1987, and a week later finished third behind fellow Dane Hans Nielsen and American Rick Miller in the West End Speedway International at the Wayville Showground in Adelaide. He announced his retirement at the end of August 1990 after a crash in Australia but returned to racing the following year.

World final appearances

Individual World Championship
 1981 -  London, Wembley Stadium - 3rd - 12+2pts
 1985 -  Bradford, Odsal Stadium - 6th - 10pts
 1986 -  Chorzów, Silesian Stadium - 5th - 10pts
 1991 -  Gothenburg, Ullevi - 4th - 11+2pts
 1992 -  Wrocław, Olympic Stadium - 4th - 9pts
 1994 -  Vojens, Speedway Center - 5th - 10pts

World Pairs Championship
 1985 -  Rybnik, Rybnik Municipal Stadium (with Erik Gundersen) - Winner - 29pts (13)
 1991 -  Poznań, Olimpia Poznań Stadium (with Hans Nielsen / Jan O. Pedersen) - Winner - 28pts (0)
 1992 -  Lonigo, Pista Speedway (with Hans Nielsen / Brian Karger) - 5th - 16pts (1)
 1993 -  Vojens, Speedway Center (with Hans Nielsen / Brian Karger) - 3rd - 21pts (6)

World Team Cup
 1981 -  Olching, Olching Speedwaybahn (with Ole Olsen / Hans Nielsen / Erik Gundersen / Finn Thomsen) - Winner - 36pts (9)
 1982 -  London, White City (with Ole Olsen / Hans Nielsen / Erik Gundersen / Preben Eriksen) - 2nd - 24pts (1)
 1985 -  Long Beach, Veterans Memorial Stadium (with Erik Gundersen / Hans Nielsen / Preben Eriksen / Bo Petersen) - Winner - 37pts (12)
 1986 -  Gothenburg, Ullevi,  Vojens, Speedway Center and  Bradford, Odsal Stadium (with Hans Nielsen / Erik Gundersen / Jan O. Pedersen / John Jørgensen) - Winner - 129pts (33)
 1987 -  Fredericia, Fredericia Speedway,  Coventry, Brandon Stadium and  Prague, Markéta Stadium (with Hans Nielsen / Erik Gundersen / Jan O. Pedersen)- Winner - 130pts (32)
 1988 -  Long Beach, Veterans Memorial Stadium (with Hans Nielsen / Jan O. Pedersen / Erik Gundersen / John Jørgensen) - Winner - 44pts (6)
 1990 -  Pardubice, Svítkov Stadion (with Hans Nielsen / John Jørgensen / Bo Petersen / Brian Karger) - 3rd - 30pts (4)
 1991 -  Vojens, Speedway Center (with Jan O. Pedersen / Hans Nielsen / Gert Handberg / Brian Karger) - Winner - 51pts (13)
 1993 -  Coventry, Brandon Stadium (with Brian Karger / Hans Nielsen / John Jørgensen / Brian Andersen) - 2nd - 38pts (12)
 1994 -  Brokstedt, Holsteinring Brokstedt (with Hans Nielsen / Jan Staechmann) - 3rd - 17pts (12)
 1995 -  Bydgoszcz, Polonia Bydgoszcz Stadium (with Hans Nielsen / Brian Karger) - Winner - 28pts (15)
 1997 -  Piła, Stadion Żużlowy Centrum (with Hans Nielsen / Jesper B. Jensen) - Winner - 27pts (13)

Individual Under-21 World Championship
 1980 -  Pocking, Rottalstadion - Winner - 14pts

Speedway Grand Prix results

References

1961 births
Danish speedway riders
Speedway World Pairs Champions
Coventry Bees riders
Living people